The 1878–79 Football Association Challenge Cup was the eighth staging of the FA Cup, England's oldest football tournament. Forty-three teams entered, although six of the forty-three never played a match.

First round

Replays

Second round

Replay

Third round

Fourth round

Replay

Second replay

Semi finals

Final

References

 FA Cup Results Archive

1878-79
1878–79 in English football
FA Cup